Dorthe Pedersen (born 5 November 1977 in Nykøbing Falster) is a Danish rower.

References 
 
 

1977 births
Living people
Danish female rowers
Olympic rowers of Denmark
Rowers at the 1996 Summer Olympics
Rowers at the 2000 Summer Olympics
Rowers at the 2004 Summer Olympics
World Rowing Championships medalists for Denmark
People from Guldborgsund Municipality
Sportspeople from Region Zealand